The Coronation of the Virgin is a subject in Christian art.

Coronation of the Virgin may also refer to:

 Coronation of the Virgin (Beccafumi)
 Coronation of the Virgin (El Greco, Illescas)
 Coronation of the Virgin (Filippo Lippi), Uffizi
 Coronation of the Virgin (Fra Angelico, Louvre)
 Coronation of the Virgin (Fra Angelico, Uffizi)
 Coronation of the Virgin (Gentile da Fabriano)
 Coronation of the Virgin (Lorenzo Monaco)
The Coronation of the Virgin by Enguerrand Quarton
 Coronation of the Virgin (Rubens)
 Coronation of the Virgin  (Velázquez)
 Coronation of the Virgin Altarpiece by Moretto da Brescia
 Marsuppini Coronation by Filippo Lippi, Vatican Museums
 Oddi Altarpiece (Raphael)